Zaid Abdul-Aziz (born Donald A. Smith; April 7, 1946) is an American former professional basketball player. He was known as Don Smith until he changed his name to Zaid Abdul-Aziz in 1976 after he converted to Islam.

Abdul-Aziz starred for the Iowa State Cyclones in college basketball before he was selected by the Cincinnati Royals as the fifth overall pick in the 1968 NBA draft. He played ten seasons in the National Basketball Association (NBA) as a member of the Royals, Milwaukee Bucks, Seattle SuperSonics, Houston Rockets, Buffalo Braves, and Boston Celtics. Abdul-Aziz was nicknamed "The Kangaroo".

Playing career
Abdul-Aziz played college basketball for the Iowa State Cyclones from 1965 to 1968. He was selected as the Big Eight Player of the Year in 1968 and was a three-time first-team All-Big Eight Conference selection. Abdul-Aziz was chosen by the Cincinnati Royals as the fifth overall pick in the 1968 NBA draft and traded to the Milwaukee Bucks during his rookie season. He was traded to the Seattle SuperSonics for Lucius Allen and Bob Boozer in 1970. Abdul-Aziz initially disputed the trade and planned to sue the NBA but instead flourished with the SuperSonics. He enjoyed a career-best season as he averaged 13.8 points and 11.3 rebounds per game during the 1971–72 season until he was sidelined with pericarditis.

Abdul-Aziz converted to Islam during his time with the SuperSonics. On September 18, 1972, his contract was bought by the Houston Rockets. Abdul-Aziz had been the team's starting center prior to the 1974–75 season. The Muslim holy month of Ramadan coincided with a Rockets training camp where Abdul-Aziz entered an anemic-like state due to his fasting. He found himself unable to play and told the team's general manager that he was quitting the team. Abdul-Aziz's father convinced him to return but he lost his position in the Rockets' line-up and never again played as a starting center in the NBA. Abdul-Aziz played his final three years as a backup on various teams before he announced his retirement in 1978 at the age of 32.

Later career
Abdul-Aziz coached the Saudi Arabia national basketball team. He was an investor in the Seattle Smashers of the International Volleyball Association in 1978 and 1979.

Abdul-Aziz studied chemical dependency at Seattle University and earned a state licence. He worked as a drug and alcohol counselor in Seattle after his playing career.

NBA career statistics

Regular season 

|-
| align="left" | 1968–69
| align="left" | Cincinnati
| 20 || – || 5.4 || .419 || – || .286 || 1.6 || .2 || – || – || 1.9
|-
| align="left" | 1968–69
| align="left" | Milwaukee
| 29 || – || 28.9 || .363 || – || .642 || 13.0 || 1.1 || – || – || 11.0
|-
| align="left" | 1969–70
| align="left" | Milwaukee
| 80 || – || 20.5 || .434 || – || .643 || 7.5 || .8 || – || – || 7.4
|-
| align="left" | 1970–71
| align="left" | Seattle
| 61 || – || 20.9 || .441 || – || .739 || 7.7 || .7 || – || – || 10.9
|-
| align="left" | 1971–72
| align="left" | Seattle
| 58 || – || 30.7 || .429 || – || .720 || 11.3 || 2.1 || – || – || 13.8
|-
| align="left" | 1972–73
| align="left" | Houston
| 48 || – || 18.8 || .397 || – || .735 || 6.3 || 1.1 || – || – || 8.7
|-
| align="left" | 1973–74
| align="left" | Houston
| 79 || – || 31.1 || .459 || – || .804 || 11.7 || 2.1 || 1.0 || 1.3 || 10.9
|-
| align="left" | 1974–75
| align="left" | Houston
| 65 || – || 22.3 || .437 || – || .783 || 7.5 || 1.3 || .6 || 1.1 || 9.7
|-
| align="left" | 1975–76
| align="left" | Seattle
| 27 || – || 8.3 || .467 || – || .552 || 2.8 || .6 || .3 ||.6 || 3.2
|-
| align="left" | 1976–77
| align="left" | Buffalo
| 22 || – || 8.9 || .338 || – || .767 || 4.1 || .3 || .1 || .4 || 3.8
|-
| align="left" | 1977–78
| align="left" | Boston	
| 2 || – || 12.0 || .231 || – || .667 || 7.5 || 1.5 || .5 || .5 || 4.0
|-
| align="left" | 1977–78
| align="left" | Houston
| 14 || – || 9.6 || 426 || – || .750 || 2.5 || .5 || .1 || .1 || 3.9
|- class="sortbottom"
| style="text-align:center;" colspan="2"| Career
| 505 || – || 21.8 || .428 || – || .728 || 8.0 || 1.2 || .6 || 1.0 || 9.0
|}

Playoffs 

|-
| align="left" | 1970
| align="left" | Milwaukee
| 7 || – || 11.7 || .579 || – || .800 || 3.7 || 0.6 || – || – || 4.3
|-
| align="left" | 1975
| align="left" | Houston
| 6 || – || 11.3 || .387 || – || .400 || 2.8 || 0.5 || – || – || 4.3
|-
| align="left" | 1976
| align="left" | Seattle
| 5 || – || 12.0 || .700 || – || .727 || 4.2 || 0.4 || – || – || 7.2
|- class="sortbottom"
| style="text-align:center;" colspan="2"| Career
| 18 || – || 11.7 || .529 || – || .500 || 3.6 || 0.5 || – || – || 5.1
|}

Personal life
As of 2011, Abdul-Aziz lived in the Northgate neighborhood of Seattle with his Moroccan-born wife. He has five children from two marriages. Abdul-Aziz's son, Yusef Smith, played college basketball for the Seattle Pacific Falcons and professionally in Brazil.

Abdul-Aziz was raised Catholic. He credits his religious awakening to a Milwaukee Bucks practice session where he was approached by teammate Kareem Abdul-Jabbar and failed to explain a gold cross that he was wearing around his neck when questioned. Abdul-Aziz went to a Milwaukee library to learn about religions and borrowed a copy of the Bhagavad Gita, Bible, Quran and Torah. Abdul-Aziz stated: "everything pointed me to Islam. So the next year I became a Muslim."

In 2006, Abdul-Aziz published a memoir, Darkness to Sunlight, which tells the stories of his basketball career, personal challenges, and spiritual journey.

References

External links
Career statistics

1946 births
Living people
20th-century African-American sportspeople
21st-century African-American people
African-American basketball players
All-American college men's basketball players
American men's basketball players
American Muslims
African-American Muslims
Basketball players from New York City
Boston Celtics players
Buffalo Braves players
Centers (basketball)
Cincinnati Royals draft picks
Cincinnati Royals players
Converts to Islam
Houston Rockets players
Iowa State Cyclones men's basketball players
Milwaukee Bucks players
Power forwards (basketball)
Seattle SuperSonics players
Sportspeople from Brooklyn
20th-century African-American people